Nancy E. Bone is an American former intelligence officer who served as Director of National Photographic Interpretation Center between October 1993 and September 1996.

Biography 
Nancy Bone received her BA in 1966 from St Louis University, graduating magna cum laude with a concentration in English language and literature  In 1973 she earned a master's degree in library science.

After spending two years as a secondary school teacher, she joined the Central Intelligence Agency in July 1968 as an analyst of information at the National Photographic Interpretation Center (NPIC). In April 1972, she received promotion to intelligence officer. She served as a branch chief for two years and then as deputy branch chief of Administration at NPIC. Between 1976 and 1993 Bone served successively as branch chief of Image Analysis, as division chief in Graphic Arts, as executive officer, as director of Management and Planning in the Directorate of Science and Technology, as chief of the Priority Exploitation Group, and, between 1991 and 1993, as director of Imagery Analysis. Nancy Bone retired in December 1999.

On October 3, 2017; Bone was inducted to the Geospatial Intelligence Hall of Fame Class of 2017 by the National Geospatial-Intelligence Agency, during a ceremony at the agency’s headquarters in Springfield, Virginia.

Nancy Bone led the way for women in the intelligence community as the director of NGA’s predecessor agency the National Photographic Interpretation Center. She spearheaded the effort to create innovation in information sharing which led to the first time NPIC analysts and support personnel could electronically access CIA files, exchange work documents and communicate with colleagues. She also pushed NPIC to increase dissemination of digital products and become a major provider of products and information on classified shared networks, increasing the availability of essential NPIC products for customers worldwide.

References

People of the Central Intelligence Agency
Year of birth missing (living people)
Living people